The World RX of Sweden is a Rallycross event held in Sweden for the FIA World Rallycross Championship. The event made its debut in the 2014 season, at the Höljesbanan circuit in the village of Höljes.

Past winners

Source

References

External links

Sweden
Auto races in Sweden